Mount William  is a small community in the Canadian province of Nova Scotia, located in Pictou County.

References
Mount William on Destination Nova Scotia

Communities in Pictou County
General Service Areas in Nova Scotia